Zoltán Kárpáthy is a 1966 Hungarian drama film directed by based on the eponymous novel by Mór Jókai.

Cast 
 István Kovács - Kárpáthy Zoltán
 Zoltán Latinovits - Szentirmay Rudolf
 Lajos Básti - Wesselényi Miklós
 Zoltán Várkonyi - Maszlaczky ügyvéd
 Éva Ruttkai - Flóra, Szentirmay felesége
 Vera Szemere - Kõcserepyné
 Vera Venczel - Szentirmay Katinka
 Mária Sulyok - Mayerné
 Tibor Bitskey - Kis Miska 
 Iván Darvas - Kárpáthy Abellino

References

External links 

1966 drama films
1966 films
Films based on Hungarian novels
Films directed by Zoltán Várkonyi
Hungarian drama films